Salvation Army Halt railway station was initially a private non-timetabled halt for the staff of Messrs Sander & Sons which had established an orchid-growing business in the Camp district of St Albans. A private siding (known as "Sander's Sidings") also led directly to the firm's greenhouses, enabling the swift dispatch of orchids to the market. The halt was also used by Salvation Army personnel working at the Army's printing works on Campfield Road, and it was from this that the halt obtained its name. Just after the station, a short branch line departed to the east and served Hertfordshire County Mental Hospital.

References

Disused railway stations in Hertfordshire
Former Great Northern Railway stations
Railway stations in Great Britain opened in 1897
Railway stations in Great Britain closed in 1951
Buildings and structures in St Albans
Salvation Army buildings